Do-gooder derogation is a phenomenon where a person's morally motivated behavior leads to them being perceived negatively by others. The term "do-gooder" refers to a person who deviates from the majority in terms of behavior, because of their morality.

Research 

Research surrounding "do-gooder derogation" takes many different forms. These include public goods games, experiments designed to measure altruism and generosity, and the analysis of preexisting data. Studies on meat eaters' perceptions of vegetarians indicate that meat eaters held more negative views towards vegetarians if they imagined the vegetarians morally judging them for their dietary choices. From this, the researchers concluded that moral minorities may receive backlash for their morally motivated behavior from members of the mainstream who feel morally judged.

A study on generosity in children indicated that initially children favored generous individuals, but that this preference was reduced when the child's own generosity was not as good as another child's. However, this did not hold up when the child compared their own generosity to an adult.

A combination of moral and dominance personality traits in a person have been linked to an increased level of moral self-righteousness and dislike by perceivers.

Research suggests that the most generous can be punished more than those less generous.

Possible reasons for do-gooder derogation

Threatened sense of morality and self-worth 

One possible reason for do-gooder derogation is 'anticipated moral reproach'. This describes a threat to one's moral standing and to their sense of self-worth.

Research suggests that since people are highly sensitive to any criticism or challenge to their morals, they are more likely to put down the source of this 'threat'.

In research regarding non-vegetarians' attitudes towards vegetarians, non-vegetarians tended to harbor more hostile feelings towards vegetarians when they believed that the vegetarians saw themselves as morally superior. However, not all vegetarians choose to be so because of moral reasons.

Other research looked at morally uncomfortable decision-making scenarios, for example a criminal lineup where the obvious guilty suspect is the only African American suspect and participants were asked to pick out the guilty suspect. Most participants followed the instructions, but 'moral do-gooders' refused to, on the basis that the activity was 'offensive'. The moral do-gooders were disliked by the rest of the group and rated more negatively in the first experiment. However, later in the study, participants were assured of their moral standing and the validity of their own decisions despite that of the moral do-gooder, and they were less sensitive to moral reproach, rating the do-gooders less negatively.

Social comparison and violation of social norms 

Another possible explanation for do-gooder derogation is social comparison. Tasimi, Dominguez & Wynn (2015) offered the idea that do-gooder derogation could be put down to do-gooders deviating from the social norm.

In a public goods game, where there was a punishment condition introduced, participants tended to punish anyone who cooperated more or less than the social norm: the low contributors, but also the high contributors, even though their generosity benefited the whole group.

In addition, real-world data from an online fundraising website found that not only were the lowest donations anonymized, but so were the highest. This is compatible with the explanation of social comparison, whereby those donating the highest amounts are violating the social norms and therefore maintain anonymity. This might be because the top donators have set the bar at an undesirably high level and "make the contributions of others look less impressive by comparison."

In another study looking at do-gooder derogation in children, participants preferred a more generous character throughout the study, which has inconsistencies with do-gooder derogation. However, when the child's generosity was less than that of another child it didn't reverse their preference for the more generous child, their preference for the generous child lessened, but didn't disappear. Furthermore, when the child compared themselves to a more generous adult, there was no evidence of less preferable attitudes, perhaps as the children don't socially compare themselves to adults: social comparison leads us to feel negatively about people in similar situations to our own who make better decisions than us.

In the original public goods game, Monin, Sawyer and Marquez (2008) found that a relevant factor in do-gooder derogation is their level of involvement in the decision: if the participant made a less generous decision before the do-gooder made theirs, they were more likely to feel negatively towards the do-gooder. However, if they were onlookers in the game, they were more likely to rate the do-gooders positively.

Other possible explanations 

Existential freedom: individuals will ignore their own freedom in decision making, blaming their decision on situational pressures.

Perceived altruism of the act: if individuals performed altruistic acts for intended gains, the act is seen as more selfish than altruistic. There is also the possibility of ulterior motives behind altruistic acts: do-gooder derogation may be a defense mechanism.

Feelings of lesser morality: individuals might question their own morality as they compare themselves with do-gooders.

Shame and guilt: do-gooders are more likely to be derogated when others' sense of being a good person is threatened.

Cross-cultural differences 

There are also cross-cultural differences in the extent to which do-gooder derogation happens. Hermann, Thöni & Gächter (2008) looked at cross cultural differences when carrying out their public goods experiment in 16 different participant pools. Raihani (2014) also observed some cultural differences with regards to donations and anonymity. Some of the findings were:

 In western Europe and the United States, punishment conditions, rather than non-punishment conditions, increased the cooperation between participants. This might be reflective of the importance and dominance of the law is in these societies.
 Muslim participants were more likely to donate higher amounts to a charitable cause under anonymous conditions. This could be because of the dismissal of 'impure' status-seeking generosity in Islam. This hidden altruism is, however, found in many other cultural pools.
 Collectivist societies seem to punish do-gooders more than in individualistic societies. This might be because participants from collectivist cultures are more inclined to perceive other participants as part of the out-group, especially if they are violating social norms by being overly generous.

See also 
 The History of Little Goody Two-Shoes
 Busybody
 Gutmensch
 Psychology of eating meat
 Vegaphobia
 Virtue signaling

References 

Moral psychology
Social phenomena